İslahiye District is a district of Gaziantep Province of Turkey. Its seat is the town İslahiye.

References

Districts of Gaziantep Province